Laoennea is a genus of air-breathing land snails, terrestrial pulmonate gastropod mollusks in the family Diapheridae.

Species
There are two species in the genus Laoennea:
Laoennea carychioides Páll-Gergely, A. Reischütz & Maassen, 2020
Laoennea renouardi Jochum & Wackenheim, 2020

References

External links

Diapheridae